The Comunidade Intermunicipal da Lezíria do Tejo (English: Tagus Floodplain) is an administrative division in Portugal. It was established as an Associação de Municípios in 1987, converted into a Comunidade Urbana in 2003, and converted into a Comunidade Intermunicipal in November 2008. It is also a NUTS3 subregion of the Alentejo Region. The seat of the intermunicipal community is the city of Santarém. Lezíria do Tejo comprises municipalities of the former districts of Santarém and Lisbon. In the past, the territory of this administrative division was roughly entirely set in the former historical province of Ribatejo and had nothing to do with the former historical province of Alentejo. Lezíria is the Portuguese word (from the Arabic الجزيرة, al-jazira, "the island") for floodplain or freshwater marsh. Tejo is the name of the main river in the region. The Lezíria is a well-renowned center of intensive farming, horse breeding and animal husbandry.

Municipalities
It is composed of 11 municipalities:

See also
Companhia das Lezírias
Lezíria Bridge
Ribatejo

References

External links
Official website CIM Lezíria do Tejo

Alentejo
Intermunicipal communities of Portugal
States and territories established in 1987
1987 establishments in Portugal